Siebold Sissingh (5 July 1899 – 31 May 1960) was a Dutch footballer. He played in one match for the Netherlands national football team in 1921.

References

External links
 

1899 births
1960 deaths
Dutch footballers
Netherlands international footballers
Place of birth missing
Association footballers not categorized by position